Stagecoach of the Condemned is a 1970 Spanish western film directed by Juan Bosch. It is produced and written by Ignacio F. Iquino, scored by Enrique Escobar and starring Bruno Corazzari, Erika Blanc, Fernando Sancho and Richard Harrison.

Cast

References

External links
 

Spanish Western (genre) films
Films directed by Juan Bosch
Films produced by Ignacio F. Iquino
Films with screenplays by Ignacio F. Iquino
Films with screenplays by Luciano Martino
Films based on Spanish novels
Films shot in Barcelona
1970 Western (genre) films
1970 films
1970s Spanish films